Soe Khin (born 1 November 1950) is a Burmese long-distance runner. He competed in the marathon at the 1980 Summer Olympics.

References

External links
 

1950 births
Living people
Athletes (track and field) at the 1980 Summer Olympics
Burmese male long-distance runners
Burmese male marathon runners
Olympic athletes of Myanmar
Place of birth missing (living people)
Southeast Asian Games medalists in athletics
Southeast Asian Games gold medalists for Myanmar